Laser medicine consists in the use of lasers in medical diagnosis, treatments, or therapies, such as laser photodynamic therapy, photorejuvenation, and laser surgery.

The word "laser" stands for Light Amplication by Stimulated Emission of Radiation.

History 
In the year 1960, the invention of laser and the potential use were explored in medicine.Because laser benefits from three interesting characteristics in the field of  application: directivity ( multiple directional functions ), << Impulse>> ( possibility operating in very short pulses.) and  monochromaticity. 

Several medical applications will therefore be found among this new instrument.First the United States : the ruby laser was used in 1961 by Campbell in Ophthalmology and in 1963 by Goldman in Dermatology.After, the argon ionized laser ( wavelength: 488-514nm) has become the preferred laser for the treatment of retinal detachment.The carbon dioxide laser  ( CO2), introduced by Polanyi et Kaplan in 1965 and 1967, was first implemented in surgery with the concept of " optical scalpel."  

The possibility of the using optical fiber( over a short distance ,in the operating room) from the year 1970 there has opened many laser applications; in particular endocavitary, thanks to the possibility  to introducing the fiber into the channel of an endoscope. In this period, gastroenterology and pneumology began to use the argon laser( Dwyer in 1975) and especially the " YAG" laser( Kiefhaber, 1975).

In 1976 Dr. Hofstetter employed laser for the first time en urology.Thanks to laser dye, the late 1970s saw the rise of photodynamic therapy.( Dougherty, 1972)

Since the early 1980s, the applications have particularly developed and laser has become indispensable too in ophthalmology, but also in gastroenterology and in facial and aesthetic surgery.

In 1980, two medical  societies  were created especially to mark the specialization of certain branches of medicine thanks to laser. The " ASLMS" ( American Society for Laser in Medicine and Surgery) and the "SFLM" (Francophone society of medical lasers).

After the end of the 20th century, the number of many centers dedicated to laser medicine have opened, first in the OCDE, after then more generally  since the beginning of the 21st century.

The Lindbergh Operation, was a historic surgical operation between surgeons in New York( United States) and doctors and a patient in Strasbourg ( France) in 2001. Among other things they utilized the use of laser.

Advantages 
Laser presents multiple unique advantages that make it very popular among various types of practitioners.

 Due to it's directional precision, laser is used to precisely cut and cauterize all kinds of tissues without damaging neighboring cells.It's the safest technique and most precise cutting  and precise cutting and cauterizing never before practiced in medicine.
 Laboratories make extensive use of lasers, especially for spectroscopy analysis and more generally the analysis of biochemical samples.It makes it possible to literally "see" and  more quickly the composition of a cell or sample on a microscopic scale.
 The electrical intensity of a laser is easily controllable in a safe way for the patient, but also a variable at will, which gives it a very wide and still partially explored range of uses ( in 2021).

Disadvantages 
The principle disadvantage is not the medical, but rather economic: its cost. Although it has dropped significantly in developed countries since it's inception, it remains more expensive than most other common technical means, due to materials, the technicality of the equipment necessary for the operation of any laser therapy, as well as only to certain specific training.

For example, in France( as in other countries with a social security system) dental, endodonic or periodontal laser treatment is classified outside the nomenclature and therefore not reimbursed by social security.

Lasers
Lasers used in medicine include in principle any type of laser, but especially:
 CO2 lasers, used to cut, vaporize, ablate and photo-coagulate soft tissue.
 diode lasers
 dye lasers
 excimer lasers
 fiber lasers
 gas lasers
 free electron lasers
 semiconductor diode lasers

Applications in medicine

Examples of procedures, practices, devices, and specialties where lasers are utilized include:

 angioplasty
 cancer diagnosis
cancer treatment
 Dentistry
 cosmetic dermatology such as scar revision, skin resurfacing, laser hair removal, tattoo removal 
 dermatology, to treat melanoma
 frenectomy
 lithotripsy 
laser mammography
 medical imaging
 microscopy
 ophthalmology (includes Lasik and laser photocoagulation)
 optical coherence tomography
 optogenetics
 prostatectomy
 plastic surgery, in laser liposuction, and in treatment of skin lesions (congenital and acquired) and in scar management (burns and surgical scars)
 surgery, to cut, ablate, and cauterize tissue

See also
Dental laser
Endovenous laser therapy
Laser-assisted new attachment procedure
Laser surgery
Light therapy
Low level laser therapy
Photodynamic therapy
Photomedicine

References

External links

 
Laser applications
Medical physics